Warren Skorodenski (born March 22, 1960) is a retired professional ice hockey goaltender who played for the Chicago Black Hawks and the Edmonton Oilers in the National Hockey League (NHL).

While playing for the New Brunswick Hawks during the 1981–82 AHL season, Skorodenski shared the Harry "Hap" Holmes Memorial Award for the American Hockey League's lowest goals against average with teammate Bob Janecyk. As Murray Bannerman's backup in Chicago in 1984–85, Skorodenski recorded the league's highest save percentage, at 0.903. He retired in 1991.

Career statistics

Regular season and playoffs

Awards
 WHL Second All-Star Team – 1979

External links
 

1960 births
Living people
Canadian ice hockey goaltenders
Calgary Wranglers (WHL) players
Chicago Blackhawks players
Edmonton Oilers players
Kildonan North Stars players
New Brunswick Hawks players
Ice hockey people from Winnipeg
Undrafted National Hockey League players
Winnipeg Clubs players